Mjr Frank Bernard Baldwin (February 20, 1920 - April 17, 2004) from Pittsburg, Michigan was a United States Marine Corps World War II Ace pilot who shot down 10 enemy aircraft in combat. He was the recipient of the Distinguished Flying Cross.

Career

Baldwin enlisted in 1942 and flew he flew in over 186 missions in the Pacific Theatre of World War II. In one reconnaissance mission over Kyushu April 6, 1944, Baldwin shot down four Japanese enemy aircraft.

Awards

6 Air Medals
Congressional Gold Medal (2015)
Distinguished Flying Cross
Purple Heart
Navy Cross
United States Marine corps Hall of Fame

Death
In 2004 Baldwin died in Hospice after struggling with cancer for several years.

See also
List of World War II aces from the United States
List of World War II flying aces

References

Further reading

Notes

1920 births
2004 deaths
United States Marine Corps
United States Marine Corps in World War II
American World War II flying aces
Military personnel from Michigan
United States Army personnel of World War II
Recipients of the Distinguished Flying Cross (United States)